Izak Šantej (born August 26, 1973 in Slovenia) is a Slovenian motorcycle speedway rider who rode in the Speedway Grand Prix series.

Career
Šantej medalled 12 times at the Slovenian Individual Speedway Championship. Although he won 10 silver medals and 2 bronze medals he never became champion of Slovenia, being denied the gold medal 5 times by Matej Žagar and 5 times by Matej Ferjan.

Family
Izak Šantej and his wife, Hermina, have three children, Žan, Miha and Sara.

Speedway Grand Prix results

Career highlights 
 Individual World Championship (Speedway Grand Prix):
 2002 - 39th place (1 point)
 2003 - 35th place (4 points)
 2004 - 41st place (1 point)
 Team World Championship (Speedway World Cup):
 2000 - 2nd place in Quarter-Final 2 (12 points)
 2001 - 12th place (5 points in Event 2)
 2002 - 11th place (6 points in Event 3)
 2003 - 9th place (4 points in Event 2)
 2004 - 2nd place in Qualifying Round 2 (13 points)
 2005 - 2nd place in Qualifying Round 2 (3 points)
 2006 - 2nd place in Qualifying Round 2 (8 points)
 2007 - 4th place in Qualifying Round 1 (8 points)
 Individual European Championship:
 2001 - 14th place (3 points)
 2004 - 14th place (3 points)
 2007 - 13th place in Qualifying Round 1 (4 points)
 2008 - 10th place in Semi-Final 1 (6 points)
 European Pairs Championship:
 2004 - 6th place (7 points)
 2005 - 3rd place (6 points)
 2006 - 2nd place (dit not started in Final)
 2007 - 4th place in Semi-Final 1 (9 points)
 2008 - 5th place in Semi-Final 1 (9 points)
 European Club Champions' Cup:
 1998 - 2nd place in Group A (12 points)
 1999 - 2nd place in Group (10 points)
 2003 - 3rd place
 2004 - 3rd place (13 points)
 2006 - 3rd place in Semi-Final 2 (5 points)
 2007 - 3rd place in Semi-Final 1 (14 points)
 Individual Slovenian Championship:
 1995 - 3rd place
 1997 - 2nd place
 1998 - 2nd place
 1999 - 2nd place
 2000 - 2nd place
 2001 - 2nd place
 2002 - 2nd place
 2003 - 2nd place
 2004 - 2nd place
 2006 - 2nd place
 2007 - 3rd place
 Team Slovenian Championship:
 1993 - 2nd place (AMD Krsko)
 1995 - 2nd place (AMD Krsko)
 1996 - Slovenian Champion (AMD Krsko)
 1997 - 2nd place (AMD Krsko)
 1998 - 2nd place (AMD Krsko)
 1999 - 2nd place (AMD Krsko)
 2000 - 2nd place (AMD Krsko)
 2001 - 2nd place (AMD Krsko)
 2002 - 2nd place (AMD Krsko)
 2003 - 2nd place (AMD Krsko)
 2004 - Slovenian Champion (AMD Krsko)

References 

 KSM Krosno Website - rider profile

See also 
 Slovenia national speedway team
 List of Speedway Grand Prix riders

1973 births
Living people
Slovenian speedway riders